Nir Tzvi is a moshav in central Israel. Located near Lod, it falls under the jurisdiction of Sdot Dan Regional Council.

History
The village was founded in 1954 by immigrants from Argentina and was initially called Kfar Argentina (Argentina Village). The village land was owned by the Jewish National Fund, which financed 35 homes being built. The village was later renamed after Maurice "Zvi" de Hirsch who had helped the Jews of Argentina.

Education
The moshav hosts the primary school that serves as the educational institute for all the children from first to eighth grade in the Sdot Dan Regional Council.

See also

Argentine Jews in Israel

References

External links
Village website 

Argentine-Jewish culture in Israel
Moshavim
Agricultural Union
Populated places established in 1954
Populated places in Central District (Israel)
1954 establishments in Israel